With 25 years of academic excellence, Charlotte Islamic Academy (C.I.Academy) is a Cognia accredited Islamic School In Charlotte, North Carolina for Prek-12th grade - Charlotte Islamic Academy is a comprehensive private school with a college preparatory focus. Students are challenged academically and are inspired to become better citizens through their Islamic education. Our philosophy of education aims toward the fullest development of the potentialities of Muslim children to enable them to attain success in this life and in the Hereafter. The current principal is Dr. D'Andrea Heggs.

References

External links
Charlotte Islamic Academy website

Islam in North Carolina
Islamic schools in North Carolina
Schools in Charlotte, North Carolina
Private high schools in North Carolina
Private middle schools in North Carolina
Private elementary schools in North Carolina
Educational institutions established in 1998
1998 establishments in North Carolina